William Thomas Graves (born May 15, 1988) is an American professional basketball player who last played for FC Porto of the Liga Portuguesa de Basquetebol (LPB). He played college basketball for North Carolina before playing professionally in Japan, Argentina, Venezuela, Iceland, Israel and Portugal.

Early life and college career
Graves attended James B. Dudley High School in Greensboro, North Carolina, where he averaged 25.1 points and shooting 44 percent from beyond the arc, leading the team to two state championships. Graves was named North Carolina High School Player of the Year in 2006.

Graves played three years of college basketball for the University of North Carolina. He averaged 9.8 points and 4.6 rebounds in his junior year.

College statistics

|-
| style="text-align:left;"| 2007–08
| style="text-align:left;"| North Carolina
|36 ||0  || 5.2 ||.391 ||.442  || .583 ||1.44  ||0.33 || 0.14 ||0.08  ||2.22
|-
| style="text-align:left;"| 2008–09
| style="text-align:left;"| North Carolina
|23 || 0 || 10.5 ||.427 || .263 ||.889|| 2.30 ||0.70 || 0.30 || 0.09 || 3.57
|-
| style="text-align:left;"| 2009–10
| style="text-align:left;"|North Carolina
|36  || 34 || 24.2 ||.366 ||.371  ||.806||4.64  ||0.89 || 0.64 || 0.19 || 3.81
|-
|-
|- class="sortbottom"
! style="text-align:center;" colspan=2|  Career 

!95 ||34 || 13.7 ||.380 || .367 ||.783  || 2.86 ||0.63  || 0.37 ||0.13  ||5.42
|-

Professional career

Early years (2011–2014)

On February 10, 2011, Graves signed with the Akita Northern Happinets of Japan and started his professional career.

On October 6, 2014, Graves signed with Keflavík of the Icelandic Úrvalsdeild. On November 13, 2014, Graves recorded a career-high 39 points, shooting 15-of-26 from the field, along with six rebounds, six assists and three blocks in a 87–82 win over ÍR Reykjavíkur. In 10 games played for Keflavík, he averaged 22.9 points and 8 rebounds per game.

Israel (2014–2018)
On December 17, 2014, Graves parted ways with Keflavík to join the Israeli team Maccabi Haifa for the rest of the season. On March 25, 2016, Graves participated in the 2016 Israeli League All-Star Game. In his second season with Maccabi Haifa, Graves helped the team reach the 2016 Israeli League Playoffs as the third seed, but they eventually lost to Maccabi Rishon LeZion in the Quarterfinals.

On February 27, 2017, Graves recorded an Israeli League career-high 34 points, shooting 12-of-20 from the field, along with eight rebounds in a 96–97 loss to Maccabi Tel Aviv. On April 20, 2017, Graves suffered a season-ending injury in a match against Maccabi Tel Aviv.

On August 4, 2017, Graves signed a one-year contract extension with Maccabi Haifa. However, on November 5, 2017, Graves parted ways with Haifa after playing three seasons with the team.

On August 8, 2018, Graves signed a one-year deal with Hapoel Haifa of the Israeli National League. However, on October 24, 2018, he parted ways with Hapoel Haifa before appearing in an official game for them.

Portugal (2019)
On February 27, 2019, Graves signed with the Portuguese team FC Porto for the rest of the season. In 20 games played for Porto, he averaged 13 points, 6.1 rebounds and 1.1 assists per game. Graves helped the team reach the Portuguese League Semifinals, where they eventually fell short to Benfica.

Musical endeavour
In his off-court life, Graves is a rapper, who has published original songs under the recording name Willy G.

Career statistics

NBA Preseason Stats 

|-
|style="text-align:left;"|2016–17
|style="text-align:left;"|Haifa
| 1 || 0 || 26.8 || .000 || .000 || .000 || 5.00 || 2.00 || 1.00 || 0.00 ||0.00
|-
|style="text-align:left;"|2017–18
|style="text-align:left;"|	Haifa
| 3 || 2 || 20.4 || .280 || .167 || .500 || 3.00 || 0.67 || 0.33 || 0.00 || 5.67
|-
|- class="sortbottom"
! style="text-align:center;" colspan=2|  Career 

!4 ||2 || 22.0 ||.219 || .143 ||.500  || 3.50 ||1.00  || 0.50 ||0.005  ||4.25
|-

Regular season

|-
| align="left" | 2010–11
| align="left" | Akita
|16 ||15 || 32.1 ||.388  || .348 ||.741  || 11.2|| 1.7 || 0.8 ||0.3  ||22.2 
|-
| align="left" | 2011–12
| align="left" | Boca
|39 ||38 || 28.9 ||.386  || .261 ||.865  || 6.28|| 0.92 || 0.59 ||0.26  ||10.74 
|-
| align="left" | 2011–12
| align="left" | Marinos
|11 ||4 || 20.9 ||.411  || .389 ||.778  || 2.91|| 0.82 || 0.73 ||0.36  ||9.27 
|-
| align="left" | 2011–12
| align="left" | Libertad
|11 ||11 || 33.2 ||.414  || .362 ||.723  || 8.64|| 1.36 || 0.64 ||0.00  ||15.91 
|-
| align="left" | 2012–13
| align="left" | Libertad
|31 ||22 || 25.9 ||.448  || .409 ||.821  || 5.39|| 0.77 || 0.52 ||0.16  ||12.87 
|-
| align="left" | 2012–13
| align="left" | Malvin
|12 ||    || 33.6 ||.442  || .301 ||.808  || 7.3|| 2.2 || 0.8 ||0.3  ||16.3 
|-
| align="left" | 2013–14
| align="left" | Libertad
|12 ||4 || 13.7 ||.365  || .414 ||.600  || 2.83|| 0.58 || 0.25 ||0.33  ||5.08 
|-
| align="left" | 2014–15
| align="left" | Keflavík
|10 ||10 || 31.3 ||.445  || .349 ||.659  || 8.00|| 2.80 || 1.00 ||1.20  ||22.90 
|-
| align="left" | 2014–15
| align="left" | Haifa
|23 ||3 || 25.7 ||.413  || .410 ||.750  || 4.70|| 1.22 || 0.30 ||0.17  ||12.61 
|-
| align="left" | 2015–16
| align="left" | Haifa
|31 ||23 || 28.6 ||.372  || .325 ||.761  || 4.65|| 1.26 || 0.84 ||0.42  ||11.61 
|-
| align="left" | 2016–17
| align="left" | Haifa
|28 ||7 || 24.3 ||.416  || .415 ||.771  || 4.29|| 1.14 || 0.57 ||0.46  ||11.11 
|-
| align="left" | 2017–18
| align="left" | Haifa
|5 ||2 || 20.6 ||.185  || .071 ||1.000  || 2.00|| 0.40 || 0.40 ||0.00  ||2.40 
|-
| align="left" | 2018–19
| align="left" | Porto 
|20 ||18 || 24.6 ||.395  || .324 ||.691  || 6.15|| 1.15 || 0.55 ||0.40  ||13.00 
|-

Playoffs 

|-
|style="text-align:left;"|2010–11
|style="text-align:left;"|Akita
| 2 ||  || 27.0 || .333 || .286 || .500 || 10.0 || 0.5 || 0.0 || 0.0 || 13.5
|-
|style="text-align:left;"|2011–12
|style="text-align:left;"|	Libertad
| 8 ||  || 34.1|| .407 || .300 || .769 || 9.6 || 1.3 || 0.8 || 0.0 || 17.1
|-
|style="text-align:left;"|2014–15
|style="text-align:left;"|	Haifa
| 3 ||  || 17.0|| .381 || .273 || .571 || 4.3 || 1.3 || 0.0 || 0.0 || 7.7
|-
|style="text-align:left;"|2015–16
|style="text-align:left;"|	Haifa
| 5 ||  || 33.8|| .382 || .250 || .850 || 4.0 || 1.6 || 1.2 || 0.6 || 15.6
|-

References

External links
RealGM profile
KKI.is profile

1988 births
Living people
Akita Northern Happinets players
American expatriate basketball people in Argentina
American expatriate basketball people in Iceland
American expatriate basketball people in Israel
American expatriate basketball people in Japan
American expatriate basketball people in Portugal
American expatriate basketball people in Uruguay
American expatriate basketball people in Venezuela
American men's basketball players
Basketball players from Greensboro, North Carolina
Boca Juniors basketball players
Club Malvín basketball players
FC Porto basketball players
Forwards (basketball)
Keflavík men's basketball players
Libertad de Sunchales basketball players
Maccabi Haifa B.C. players
Marinos B.B.C. players
North Carolina Tar Heels men's basketball players
Úrvalsdeild karla (basketball) players